Cream of the Crop is the eighteenth studio album released by Diana Ross & the Supremes for the Motown label. It was the final regular Supremes studio album to feature lead singer Diana Ross. The album was released in November 1969, after the release and rising success of the hit single "Someday We'll Be Together."

Background
"Someday" was originally to have been released as Ross' first solo single (Ross is backed on the recording by session singers Maxine and Julia Waters, not the Supremes). Motown chief Berry Gordy appended the Supremes billing to the single so as to create more publicity for Ross' exit from the group.

Another selection of note is "The Young Folks" the charting b-side of "No Matter What Sign You Are" from Let the Sunshine In, later covered by The Jackson 5. Cream of the Crop also includes covers of songs by The Beatles ("Hey Jude") and Bob Dylan ("Blowin' in the Wind", also covered by Stevie Wonder). Since another Ross-led Supremes single or album had not been planned, Cream of the Crop was made up mostly of vaulted material. However, many songs such as those mentioned and "Shadows of Society" portend to a much more serious image for the group. "Love Child", the album was originally slated to be even more of a concept album where songs like "Shadows of Society", "The Young Folks" and the Top 10 hit, "I'm Livin' in Shame" were examples of a new image turn for the group had Ross remained in the group.

The lead #1 single, "Someday We'll Be Together" proved to be a multi-format smash winning back their black fan base while not alienating their pop audience. The previous singles had much more of a pop sound. Along with their increasingly polished pop image, the group found themselves at odds with the new black pride sweeping across America. So it was a befitting finale for "Someday We'll Be Together" to reunite both of their audiences after The Supremes had originally been credited with leading the pop crossover for black acts in the 1960s. As the final #1 single of the exciting but turbulent 1960s, 
"Someday We'll Be Together" would prove quite prophetic in many ways. Fast forward forward to 1993, the Frankie Knuckles mix of "Someday We'll Be Together" would become the lead single from Diana's retrospective box set, Forever Diana: Musical Memoirs.

The album closer, "The Beginning of the End", features Motown artist Syreeta Wright alongside Ross and Supremes members Mary Wilson and Cindy Birdsong. Wright was Berry Gordy's original choice to replace Ross in the Supremes because she had a range and tone similar to Ross. However, Gordy and Supremes manager Shelly Berger decided instead to replace Ross with Jean Terrell, after seeing Terrell perform with her brother Ernie as part of their band, Ernie Terrell & the Heavyweights.

Reception
Its modest Billboard album chart ranking at #33, though the album went Gold, was as much a reflection on the company's forthcoming focus on Diana Ross' solo debut as it was on the album's content of "second tier" songwriters. Motown had flooded the market with at least 4 new albums in a twelve-month period.

Track listing

Side one
"Someday We'll Be Together" (Johnny Bristol, Harvey Fuqua, Jackey Beavers) - 3:15
"Can't You See It's Me" (Pam Sawyer, Ivy Jo Hunter, Jack Goga) - 2:33
"You Gave Me Love" (Bristol, Fuqua, Marv Johnson) - 2:40
"Hey Jude" (John Lennon, Paul McCartney) - 2:59
"The Young Folks" (Allen Story, George Gordy) - 3:13
"Shadows of Society" (Goga, Hunter, Walter Fields) - 2:59

Side two
"Loving You Is Better Than Ever" (Smokey Robinson) - 2:45
"When It's to the Top (Still I Won't Stop Giving You Love)" (Ronald Weatherspoon, James Dean, William Weatherspoon) - 2:56
"Till Johnny Comes" (Robinson) - 2:57
"Blowin' in the Wind" (Bob Dylan) - 2:57
"The Beginning of the End" (Margaret Johnson) - 2:33

Personnel
 Diana Ross – lead vocals
 Mary Wilson & Cindy Birdsong – background vocals
 Florence Ballard – background vocals on "Blowin' In The Wind"
 Syreeta Wright – background vocals on "The Beginning of the End"
 Julia Waters, Maxine Waters, & Merry Clayton – background vocals on "Someday We'll Be Together"
 Johnny Bristol – co-lead vocals on "Someday We'll Be Together''
 The Andantes – background vocals
 The Funk Brothers & various Los Angeles area session musicians – instrumentation

Charts

Weekly charts

Year-end charts

References

 Chin, Brian and Nathan, David (2000). "Reflections Of..." The Supremes [CD Box Set]. New York: Motown Record Co./Universal Music.
 Wilson, Mary and Romanowski, Patricia (1986, 1990, 2000). Dreamgirl & Supreme Faith: My Life as a Supreme. New York: Cooper Square Publishers. .

1969 albums
The Supremes albums
Albums produced by Berry Gordy
Albums produced by Johnny Bristol
Albums arranged by Paul Riser
Albums produced by Smokey Robinson
Albums arranged by Wade Marcus
Albums recorded at Hitsville U.S.A.
Motown albums